Pierre Alard (17 September 1937 – 13 January 2019) was a French athlete. He competed in the men's discus throw at the 1956 Summer Olympics and the 1960 Summer Olympics.

References

External links
 

1937 births
2019 deaths
Athletes (track and field) at the 1956 Summer Olympics
Athletes (track and field) at the 1960 Summer Olympics
French male discus throwers
Olympic athletes of France